Jonatan Straus (born 30 June 1994) is a Polish professional footballer who plays as a left-back for II liga club Radunia Stężyca.

Career
Straus left Jagiellonia Białystok at the end of the 2018–19 season. At the end of July 2019, he then joined KS Legionovia Legionowo. Six months later, Straus moved to I liga club Stomil Olsztyn.

On 20 June 2022, he left Stomil by mutual consent to join II liga side Radunia Stężyca.

Career statistics

Club

References

External links
 
 

1994 births
Living people
Association football defenders
Polish footballers
Poland youth international footballers
Poland under-21 international footballers
Ekstraklasa players
I liga players
II liga players
Jagiellonia Białystok players
Sandecja Nowy Sącz players
Wigry Suwałki players
OKS Stomil Olsztyn players
Polish people of German descent
People from Nowe Miasto Lubawskie
Sportspeople from Warmian-Masurian Voivodeship